Kot Haji Shah Halt railway station also known as Kotla Haji Shah is  located in  Pakistan.

See also
 List of railway stations in Pakistan
 Pakistan Railways

References

External links

Railway stations in Layyah District